Clarence W. Blount (April 20, 1921 – April 12, 2003) was an American politician who was the first African American to be the majority leader of the Maryland State Senate. He represented the 41st district in Baltimore City from January 11, 1971 to January 8, 2003.

Background
Clarence Blount was born to Lottie and Charles Johnson Blount Sr., in South Creek, North Carolina, and one of four children. As a child, Blount helped his father work on a tobacco plantation. The Blount family was so poor that they could not afford to buy their children shoes. When Blount was five years old, his mother died, and his family moved to Baltimore during the Great Depression, growing up in the 400 block of North Carey Street. It was only after the family moved to Baltimore that Clarence Blount was able to begin school at the age of 10. He attended Baltimore City public schools and graduated from Douglass High School and then decided to go to college. One month after Blount entered Morgan State College, he was drafted into the then segregated United States Army to fight in World War II. He served with distinction in Italy as a member of the all-Black Buffalo Division of the 92nd Infantry. The courage and dedication to duty that he demonstrated while removing mines from a river passage earned him a battlefield commission. After fighting for his country against both the enemy and the barriers of Jim Crow, Blount returned to Morgan State in 1946 and graduated in 1950 with a B.A. in political science. Blount would later attend The Johns Hopkins University, earning an M.L.A. degree in 1965. Clarence Blount was a former principal and educator at Dunbar High School and a former executive assistant to president at the Community College of Baltimore.

Blount entered politics in the early 1970s, becoming a member of the Democratic National Committee. He was Delegate to the Democratic Party National Convention in 1988, 1992, 1996 and 2000.

In the legislature
Blount was elected to the Maryland State Senate in 1970 to represent Maryland 41st district which was and still is entirely in the boundaries of Baltimore City. In 1983, Senate President Thomas V. Miller Jr. chose Blount to be the Majority Leader of the Maryland Senate, making him its first African-American majority leader. He held this position until he left office in 2003. In 1987, he became the first Black chairman of a Senate committee – the Economic and Environmental Affairs Committee. His demeanor and stature as an educator and veteran earned him the nickname of "The Conscience of the Senate". He also served on the following committees:
 Judicial Proceedings Committee, 1971–1974
 Joint Committee on Legislative Ethics, 1972–1974
 Vice-Chair, Budget and Taxation Committee, 1975–1986 (past chair, health, education & human resources subcommittee)
 Member, Executive Nominations Committee, 1975–2003
 Legislative Policy Committee, 1979–2003 (management subcommittee)
 Spending Affordability Committee, 1982–2003
 Joint Budget and Audit Committee, 1983–1997
 Rules Committee, 1983–2003
 Co-Chair, Joint Committee on State Economic Development Initiatives, 1995–1996
 Member, Special Joint Committee on Group Homes, 1995–1996
 Joint Audit Committee, 1997
 Special Study Commission on the Maryland Public Ethics Law, 1998
 Joint Committee on Children, Youth, and Families, 1999–2003
 Senate Chair, Joint Committee on the Port of Baltimore, 2000–2003
 Co-Chair, Senate Committee on Redistricting, 2001–2002
 Member, Special Committee on Gaming, 2001–2003
 Co-Chair, Joint Committee on the Selection of the State Treasurer, 2002

In 1984, Blount was elected chairman of the Legislative Black Caucus of Maryland and served in that capacity until 1986.

Blount played an instrumental role in the state takeover of the Baltimore school system in 1997, delivering a crucial speech before a vote on legislation that put millions of dollars into the school system in return for management reforms and a state role in running the system.

On July 6, 2002, Blount announced that he would not seek re-election in 2002.

Boston v. Blount
In 1998, state delegate Frank Boston filed a lawsuit against Blount, alleging that Blount lived outside of the district he represented and should be removed from the ballot. Boston was running against Blount in the Democratic primary. At the time of the lawsuit, Blount kept an apartment with no telephone and only a futon to sleep on within the district, but lived in Pikesville, which is located outside of the district in Baltimore County. Blount's attorneys argued in court that Blount qualified to represent the district because of this apartment, relying in part on Maryland Attorney General Stephen H. Sachs's 1984 opinion that listed 20 elements that determined a politician's residence. In August 1998, Anne Arundel County Circuit Court Judge Michael E. Loney ruled that Blount lived outside of the district and was ineligible to run in it, removing his name from the ballot; Blount appealed the ruling the day after. In September 1998, the Maryland Court of Appeals ruled in favor of Blount, putting him back on the Democratic primary ballot and overturning the lower court ruling. Court of Appeals Judge John C. Eldridge wrote in the court's 29-page opinion that while the Court acknowledged that Blount's apartment was not his home, but argued that a "domicile" doesn't mean a lawmaker's primary residence. "The requirement is that one must be domiciled in the district, and domicile is not synonymous with party place of abode." The decision would come to be known as the "Clarence Blount rule".

In 2022, Maryland state senator Charles E. Sydnor III introduced and passed a bill that would place a referendum on the ballot to amend the state constitution to overturn the Boston v. Blount decision, requiring candidates to "maintain a primary place of abode" in their district for at least six months before the general election.

Legacy

Clarence W. Blount died April 12, 2003 of complications from a stroke; he was 81. Memorial services were held at the Carl J. Murphy Fine Arts Center at Morgan State University, and were moderated by state senator Joan Carter Conway. U.S. Senator Paul Sarbanes, U.S. Representatives Ben Cardin and Elijah Cummings, and current and former city, state, and judicial leaders spoke at the memorial service. After his funeral service, Blount was laid to rest in Woodlawn Cemetery. U.S. Representative Elijah Cummings honored Blount in a speech on the House floor on May 1, 2003:

The Clarence W. Blount Towers on the campus of Morgan State University were named in his honor.

Electoral history

References

External links

Maryland state senators
African-American state legislators in Maryland
Morgan State University alumni
Politicians from Baltimore
1921 births
2003 deaths
20th-century American politicians
20th-century African-American politicians
African-American men in politics
21st-century African-American people
United States Army personnel of World War II